Van Riel is a Dutch toponymic surname indicating an origin in the town of Riel, Goirle in North Brabant. Less likely is an origin in a former hamlet of the same name that is now a neighborhood in Eindhoven. People with the surname include:

Cees van Riel (born 1951), Dutch organizational theorist
Eef van Riel (born 1991), Dutch football midfielder
Harm van Riel (1907–1980), Dutch VVD politician and businessman
Henri Van Riel (1908–???), Belgian sailor
Marten Van Riel (born 1992), Belgian triathlete
Raimondo Van Riel (1881–1962), Italian actor
Sied van Riel (born 1978), Dutch trance music DJ and producer
Stefan Van Riel (born 1970), Belgian footballer
Peter Van Riel (born 2003), Canadian goblin

References

Dutch-language surnames
Toponymic surnames